Fatemeh Motamed-Arya (born October 29, 1961 in Tehran) is a multi-award-winning Iranian actress. She first got involved in theater during her teen years, and received her degree in theater from Tehran Art Institute. She is one of the most significant actresses of post-revolutionary Iranian cinema and has been called "one of the most important actresses and filmmakers of Iran."  She has been nominated nine times for the best actress award at the Fajr International Film Festival and won the Crystal Simorgh four times.

Selected filmography
 Reyhaneh (1989)
 Nassereddin Shah, Actor-e Cinema (1992 - a.k.a. Once Upon a Time, Cinema)
 Mosaferan (1992 - a.k.a. Travelers)
 Honarpisheh (1993 - a.k.a. The Actor)
 Hamsar (1994 - a.k.a. Spouse)
 Rusari Abi (1995 - a.k.a. The Blue Veiled)
 Kolah Ghermezi and Pesar Khaleh (1995)
 Mard-e Avazi (1998)
 Once Upon a Time (1999)
 Eynak-e doodi (2000)
  Azizam man kook nistam (2002)
 Kolah Ghermezi Va Sarvenaz (2002)
 Abadan (2003)
 Gilaneh (2004)
 Taghato (2005 - a.k.a. Crossroads)
 A Little Kiss (2005)
 Men at Work (2006)
 Zir-e Derakht-e Holou (2006)
 Zire Tigh (2006 - TV Series)
 Shirin (2007)
 Niloofar (2007-8)
 Mizak (2008)
 Ashpazbashi (2009 - TV Series)
 Khabe Leila (2010)
 Here Without Me (2011)
 Saad Saal Be In Salha (2011)
 Tales (2014)
 Nabat (2014)
African Violet (2019)
No Choice (2020)

Awards and honorsNominated Crystal Simorgh, Best Supporting Role Actress in 6th Fajr Film Festival, 1988, for Jahizieh Baraye RobabWinner Crystal Simorgh, Best Supporting Role Actress in 7th Fajr Film Festival, 1989, for BarahootNominated Crystal Simorgh, Best Actress in 8th Fajr Film Festival, 1990, for ReihanehWinner Crystal Simorgh, Best Actress in 10th Fajr Film Festival, 1992, for MosaferanWinner Crystal Simorgh, Best Actress in 11th Fajr Film Festival, 1993, for Yekbar Baraye HamishehWinner Crystal Simorgh, Best Actress in 12th Fajr Film Festival, 1994, for HamsarNominated Crystal Simorgh, Best Actress in 13th Fajr Film Festival, 1995, for The Blue-VeiledNominated Best Actress Award in 2nd House of Cinema, 1998, for The Changed ManNominated Best Supporting Role Actress Award in 3rd House of Cinema, 1999, for Eshgh Bealaveh do, ShokhiNominated Crystal Simorgh, Best Actress in 18th Fajr Film Festival, 2000, for Eshgh Bealaveh doNominated Best Supporting Role Actress Award in 4th House of Cinema, 2000, for Through SunglassesNominated Best Actress Award in 6th House of Cinema, 2003, for Pastry GirlNominated Crystal Simorgh, Best Actress in 22nd Fajr Film Festival, 2004, for GilanehNominated Best Actress Award in 12th House of Cinema, 2008, for Saad Saal Be In Salha
 Winner Best Actress Award in 15th House of Cinema, 2011, for Here Without Me
 Montreal World Film Festival Best Actress prize for her role in the Iranian film Here Without Me 2011
 Prix Henri-Langlois' for Actress and Cinema of the World'' 2012

Political views
Fatemeh Motamed-Arya was invited to travel to Los Angeles as part of a film seminar series on Iranian films. It was reported that Iran barred Motamed-Arya and another filmmaker from leaving Iran because of their political activities.

After receiving the Prix de Henri-Langlois 2012 award, at the ceremony, Motamed-Arya said, “Tonight we have a common reason for being together. Without thinking about our homeland or mother tongue, we share peace and beauty here and take our portion. Cinema taught us love, kindness and sharing of this life. To remember that despite our language, color and religion we love each other as human beings.”

Personal life
She is married to film producer and script writer Ahmad-Ali Hamed. Her son, Nariman Hamed is also a filmmaker based in New York.

Charity
In 2020 Fatemeh Motamed Aria, was appointed the "Ambassador of Mental Health" by the Iranian Scientific Association of Psychiatrists and the UNESCO Chair of Health Education.

She is the public face and endorser of the Iranian Diabetes Information Association.

Motamed Arya is public face and endorser of the Autism Association of Iran, as well as Behnam Daheshpour charity.

She is an active member and public face and endorser of Mahak Society to support children with cancer and the biggest charity in Iran.

Fatemeh Motamed-Arya was selected as the ambassador of the Mehrafarin Charity Society during a ceremony on March 3, 2008, at the Niavaran Cultural Center, as well as World Food Program (WFP).

References

External links

Official website

Living people
1961 births
People from Tehran
Actresses from Tehran
Iranian puppeteers
Iranian humanitarians
Iranian film actresses
Iranian voice actresses
Iranian stage actresses
Iranian television actresses
20th-century Iranian actresses
Crystal Simorgh for Best Actress winners
Members of the National Council for Peace
Crystal Simorgh for Best Supporting Actress winners